Beenak is a bounded rural locality in Victoria, Australia, to the north of the Bunyip State Park, located within the Shire of Yarra Ranges local government area. Beenak recorded a population of 17 at the 2021 census.

History
Beenak Post Office opened on 1 July 1878 and closed in 1951.

References

Towns in Victoria (Australia)
Yarra Valley
Yarra Ranges